The Girl from America is a 1925 American silent romance film directed by Josef Stein and starring Carl de Vogt, Hermann Leffler, and Cläre Lotto.

The film's sets were designed by the art director Fritz Lück.

Cast

References

Bibliography
 Gerhard Lamprecht. Deutsche Stummfilme, Volume 8.

External links

1925 films
1925 romantic comedy films
German romantic comedy films
Films of the Weimar Republic
Films directed by Josef Stein
German silent feature films
German black-and-white films
Silent romantic comedy films
1920s German films